Hugh Saunders (born 25 November 1944 in Guernsey, Channel Islands) was an English speedway rider in the National League.

Career

Started his speedway career with Eastbourne Eagles where he rode for two seasons. Then a move to Rayleigh Rockets where he rode for the next two seasons, before Rye House Rockets for 5 seasons
 as the stadium was sold and team relocated under the promotion of Len Silver.
With Len Silver, Hugh Saunders rode for other teams run by this promoter, namely Hackney Hawks in the interim between Rayleigh and Rye House.

In his final season in the sport in 1979, Saunders won the National League Knockout Cup with Rye House. On the 17th September, 1979, racing at Newcastle's Brough Park, he dislocated his ankle and ended his career.
A year later he returned for his own testimonial, to ride as reserve in a team of old friends named, for the day, the "Hughgonuts" but broke his leg in his first outing and missed the rest of the event and the post-match celebrations.

References

Links
 https://wwosbackup.proboards.com/thread/2605
 http://www.speedwayplus.com/hughie_saunders.shtml 
 http://www.speedwayresearcher.org.uk/eastbourne1969.pdf 

Defunct British speedway teams
Rayleigh, Essex
1944 births
British motorcycle racers
British speedway riders
Eastbourne Eagles riders
Hackney Hawks riders
Rye House Rockets riders
Rayleigh Rockets riders
Living people